Communist chic are elements of popular culture such as fashion and commodities based on communist symbols and other things associated with Marxism, Leninism, socialism and communism. Typical examples are T-shirts and other memorabilia with Alberto Korda's iconic photo of Che Guevara.

Journalists Christine Esche and Rosa Mossiah argue that in former communist countries, Communist Chic originates from disappointment in capitalist society.

The trend gained some momentum with the 150th anniversary of The Communist Manifesto in 1998. A 'Modern Edition' was released in New York City that year, and style expert Simon Doonan viewed the book as a desirable fashion accessory regardless of its contents. He argues "People are forgetting the Gulag and Stalin and the negative imagery ... it could be time for it to come back as pure style."

See also 
Che Guevara in fashion
Communist nostalgia
Nostalgia for the Soviet Union
Capitalist realism

References 

 
Communist propaganda
Communist nostalgia
Popular culture
Fashion aesthetics